Gettin' Together may refer to:

 Gettin' Together (Art Pepper album), 1960 
 Gettin' Together (Paul Gonsalves album), 1960 
 "Gettin' Together" (song), a 1967 song by Tommy James and the Shondells

See also
Getting Together, an American TV series